Perry Kivolowitz (born 1961) is an American computer scientist and business person. In 1985, he co-founded Advanced Systems Design Group which built hardware for the Commodore Amiga. This company was renamed Elastic Reality, Inc. and became well known as a digital imaging software provider. In 1987, Kivolowitz invented the recoverable ram drive In 1995 this company sold to Avid Technology, Inc.

In 1996 he received an Academy Award for Scientific and Technical Achievement for the invention of shape-driven warping and morphing as exemplified in the Avid Elastic Reality package once in widespread use. Dr. Garth Dickie was a co-recipient of this award.

Kivolowitz is a principal in SilhouetteFX LLC. In December 2018, the Academy of Motion Picture Arts and Sciences granted an Academy Award for Scientific and Technical Achievement to Silhouette.

He co-founded Profound Effects, Inc. (2001–2008), Hypercosm Inc. (1999–2001) and KSK Electrics, LLC (2013–2015). Kivolowitz was accepted into the Visual Effects Society

in 2012.

From 1997 to 1999 and from 2006 to 2015, Kivolowitz was a member of the Computer Sciences Department of the University of Wisconsin–Madison, first as an adjunct faculty member and then as a Faculty Associate and Instructional Program Director. During the University of Wisconsin - Madison's Sesquicentennial Celebration, Kivolowitz was honored as being one of the 150 Ways the University of Wisconsin has Touched the World. In January 2018, Kivolowitz was made Chair of the Computer Science Department at Carthage College.

Kivolowitz lectured for AT&T and Bell Labs in the early 1980s on Unix Internals and debugging primarily at an AT&T facility in Piscataway New Jersey but also across the country. In April 2012, Kivolowitz resumed lecturing on the process of debugging

As a graduate student Kivolowitz authored one of the earliest key logger programs, the source code of which was posted to Usenet in November 1983. Kivolowitz authored an early paper on file systems for write-once media presented at the 1984 USENIX conference in Salt Lake City.

Since 2004 Kivolowitz has been an invited speaker and provides expert testimony on the subject of detecting tampered digital images (both still images and video).

In 2006, Kivolowitz wed Sara Krueger Kivolowitz. He is currently a computer science professor at Carthage College.

In October 2019 it was announced that Kivolowitz had won a 2019 Engineering Emmy Award for his software SilhouetteFX.

Patents 
 5881321 Camera motion sensing system
 5754180 Computer system and process for defining and manipulating images using structured objects with variable edge characteristics
 5077604 Color printing, correction can conversion apparatus and method

References

External links
 SilhoutteFX web site
 Wisconsin Association of Computer Crime Investigators

American computer scientists
Living people
Carthage College faculty
University of Wisconsin–Madison faculty
Stony Brook University alumni
1961 births
Academy Award for Technical Achievement winners